Tiantong may refer to:

 Tiantong Temple (天童寺), a Buddhist temple in Ningbo, Zhejiang, China.
 Tiantong (Satellite) Chinese communications satellite.

Historical eras 
 Tiantong (天統, 565–569), era name used by Gao Wei, emperor of Northern Qi.
 Tiantong (天統, 1363–1366), era name used by Ming Yuzhen, emperor of Great Xia.